Richard David "Nifty" Middleton (born December 4, 1953) is a Canadian former professional ice hockey player for the New York Rangers and Boston Bruins of the National Hockey League.

Playing career
As a youth, Middleton played in the 1966 Quebec International Pee-Wee Hockey Tournament with a minor ice hockey team from Wexford, Toronto.

A right winger, Middleton was drafted in the first round, 14th overall, by the Rangers in the 1973 NHL Amateur Draft after a glittering junior career with the Oshawa Generals in which he led his league in scoring his final year and was named to the league's Second All-Star Team. He spent the 1973–74 season with the Rangers' farm team, the AHL Providence Reds, earning rookie of the year honors and being named to the AHL's First All-Star Team.

Middleton made the big club during the 1974–75 season, and despite suffering injuries that restricted him to 47 games, scored 22 goals in that limited time. The following season was not as spectacular, as he scored 24 goals in 77 games while showing defensive deficiencies.

Middleton was traded to the Boston Bruins for Ken Hodge on May 26, 1976. Rangers head coach and general manager John Ferguson Sr. was confident that his team had enough young talent to justify making Middleton expendable. What the Bruins got was a player who was ten years younger and a swifter skater than Hodge. The transaction became even more one-sided in favor of the Bruins when head coach Don Cherry developed Middleton's defensive skills to make him a solid two-way player. Hodge played only a single season more before his career ended, while Middleton became a star in Boston, scoring a hat trick in his first game as a Bruin (October 7, 1976 versus Minnesota) and nearly nine hundred points in a Bruins uniform over the next twelve years. Generally paired with centre Barry Pederson, Middleton had five straight seasons of at least forty goals and ninety points and led the Bruins to perennial glittering records. His leadership was apparent in being named co-captain (with Ray Bourque) to succeed Terry O'Reilly in 1985, a position he held until he retired, wearing the "C" during home games. Middleton was regarded as one of the best one-on-one players of all time  and currently ranks second all time in career shooting percentage (19.7) among players with 400+ goals.

His best season was the 1981–82 season, during which Middleton scored a career high 51 goals, won the Lady Byng Trophy for excellence and sportsmanship, and was named to the NHL's Second All-Star Team. The following season, Middleton led the Bruins to the league's best regular season record, and set unbroken records that year for the most points scored in the playoffs by a player not advancing to the finals (33) and for a single playoff series (19, in the quarterfinals against Buffalo). His 105 points in the 1983–84 season tied Ken Hodge's team record for most points scored in a season by a right winger, and remains unbroken.

Middleton scored 25 shorthanded goals for Boston—a Bruins' team record that was surpassed by Brad Marchand in 2018–19. Middleton had held the club record for more than 30 years since overtaking Derek Sanderson's record of 24.

Middleton also starred in international play, being named to play for Team Canada in the Canada Cup in 1981 and 1984. Teamed on the top line with Wayne Gretzky and Michel Goulet in the 1984 series, he scored four goals and four assists in seven games. Further, Middleton played in the NHL All-Star Game in 1981, 1982 and 1984.

At the time of his retirement following the 1987-88 season, Middleton ranked third on the Boston Bruins' all-time regular-season scoring list (trailing only Johnny Bucyk and Phil Esposito) with 402 goals and 496 assists for 898 points--10 more than Bobby Orr accumulated. As of the end of the 2020-21 season, Middleton was in fifth spot, having been overtaken on the list by both Raymond Bourque and Patrice Bergeron.

Middleton's 100 playoff points for Boston puts him in a sixth-place tie with Bucyk on the club's all-time list.

On November 29, 2018 the Boston Bruins retired Middleton's #16 before a game against the New York Islanders at TD Garden.

Awards, honors and achievements 
Won Red Tilson Trophy (OHL Most Outstanding Player) in 1973.
Won Dudley "Red" Garrett Memorial Award (AHL Rookie of the Year) in 1974.
Named to the AHL First All-Star Team in 1974.
Seventh Player Award — 1979
Elizabeth C. Dufresne Trophy — 1979, 1981, 1982, 1984
Bruins Three Stars Awards — 1979, 1980, 1981, 1982, 1983, 1984
NHL All-Star Game — 1981, 1982, 1984
1981 Canada Cup Silver Medal
Won NHL Lady Byng Memorial Trophy in 1982.
Named to the NHL Second All-Star Team in 1982.
1984 Canada Cup Gold Medal
His #16 Jersey is retired by the Boston Bruins.

NHL records
 Most points in one playoff series: (19)
 Highest playoff points per game average in one post-season by a right winger: (1.94)
 Highest playoff assists per game average in one post-season by a right winger: (1.29)

Retirement

In the 1986 season, Middleton was struck by a puck on the temple in practice, and missed the remainder of the season and playoffs with a concussion.  Although he wore a helmet thereafter and recovered enough to score 31 goals the following year, he had recurring headaches for the rest of his career, and retired following the 1988 season.

He retired with 448 goals and 540 assists for 988 points in 1005 games, and added 100 points in 114 playoff games.

He is currently the President of Boston Bruins Alumni and a partner in Orlanda Energy Systems. Middleton joined with New England High School Sports Showcases, running high school hockey showcases beginning in June 2014.

NESN
Middleton was a studio analyst for New England Sports Network (NESN), which covers the Boston Bruins, from 2002 to 2007.

Career statistics

Regular season and playoffs

International

See also
List of NHL players with 1,000 games played

References

External links

1953 births
Boston Bruins captains
Boston Bruins players
Boston Bruins announcers
Canadian ice hockey right wingers
EHC Bülach players
Ice hockey people from Toronto
Lady Byng Memorial Trophy winners
Living people
Minnesota Fighting Saints draft picks
National Hockey League first-round draft picks
National Hockey League players with retired numbers
New York Rangers players
New York Rangers draft picks
Oshawa Generals players